Jack Lemmon was American actor of the stage and screen. 

Lemmon has received various accolades including two Academy Awards, two Primetime Emmy Awards, five Golden Globe Awards, and a Screen Actors Guild Award. In 1960, he received a star on the Hollywood Walk of Fame, and in 1996 he received received the Kennedy Center Honors. 

He received his first Academy Award nomination and his first Academy Award for Best Supporting Actor for his role in Mister Roberts (1955). He received his second Academy Award for Best Actor for Save the Tiger (1973). He also received nominations for his performances |Some Like It Hot (1959), 
The Apartment (1960), Days of Wine and Roses (1962), The China Syndrome (1979), Tribute (1980), and Missing (1982). Nominated for 21 Golden Globe Award, he received five competitive awards for Some Like it Hot, The Apartment, Avanti! (1972), and Inherit the Wind (1999).

For his work in television he received six Primetime Emmy Award nominations winning twice for Outstanding Variety Program for Jack Lemmon in 'S Wonderful, 'S Marvelous, 'S Gers (1972) and Outstanding Lead Actor in a Limited Series or Movie for Tuesdays with Morrie (1999). For his work on the Broadway stage, he also received two Tony Award nominations for Best Leading Actor in a Play for his performances in Bernard Slade's Tribute (1979), and Eugene O'Neill's Long Day's Journey into Night (1986).

Major associations

Academy Awards

Grammy Award

Emmy Awards

Tony Awards

Industry awards

Golden Globe Awards

Screen Actors Guild Awards

Major festival awards

Berlin International Film Festival

Cannes Film Festival

Venice Film Festival

Honorary awards

The Kennedy Center Honors

Walk of Fame

Miscellaneous awards

Online Film & Television Association Awards

See also
Jack Lemmon on screen and stage

References

Lists of awards received by American actor